Richard Bush may refer to:

 Richard E. Bush (1924–2004), United States Marine and World War II Medal of Honor recipient
 Dick Bush (1931–1997), British cinematographer
 Richard Bush, founder of the Bush family and ancestor of two US presidents
 Richard C. Bush, director of Center for Northeast Asian Policy Studies of the Brookings Institution
 Richard Bush (MP) (fl. 1380s), Member of Parliament (MP) for Maldon